The list of Intercontinental Rally Challenge rallies includes all rally competitions that have been part of the Intercontinental Rally Challenge (IRC) schedule.

Note: bold text indicates 2012 rallies.

By seasons

Rallies
Auto racing lists